Three Japanese destroyers have been named :

 JDS Yūgure (DD-184), an Ariake-class destroyer of the Japan Maritime Self-Defense Force, formerly USS Richard P. Leary (DD-664)

See also 
 Yugure (disambiguation)

Imperial Japanese Navy ship names
Japanese Navy ship names